Stary Shagirt is a rural locality (a selo) and the administrative center of Shagirtskoye Rural Settlement, Kuyedinsky District, Perm Krai, Russia. The population was 820 as of 2010. There are 14 streets.

Geography 
Stary Shagirt is located 30 km west of Kuyeda (the district's administrative centre) by road. Udmurt-Shagirt is the nearest rural locality.

References 

Rural localities in Kuyedinsky District